Shangqing is a town under the county-level city of Guixi, in the municipal region of Yingtan, Jiangxi. , it has 10 villages under its administration.

It is a small stop on a major railroad - the Fuzhou branch line from the Yingtan junction on the Nanchang—Shanghai line. Most visitors will be touring the nearby Mount Longhu, a Daoist holy mountain.

Cultural interest 
Shangqing features Han dynasty temples associated with Zhang Daoling, a founder of Daoism. The town is mentioned in the beginning of the classic Yuan dynasty novel Water Margin.

References

See also
Shangqing School

Township-level divisions of Jiangxi
Guixi